Dzidra is a Latvian feminine given name. The name day of persons named Dzidra is May 27.

Notable people named Dzidra 
 Dzidra Rinkule-Zemzare (1920–2007), Latvian poet
 Dzidra Ritenberga (1928–2003), Latvian actress and film director
 Dzidra Uztupe-Karamiševa (1930–2014), Latvian basketball player and trainer

References 

Latvian feminine given names
Feminine given names